is a national highway connecting Kita-ku in the city of Osaka, Osaka Prefecture, and the city of Tsu, Mie Prefecture, Japan.

Route description
Length: 126.5 km 
Origin: Kita-ku, Osaka, Osaka Prefecture (originates at the terminus of Routes 2, 25, and 176)
Terminus: Tsu, Mie Prefecture

References

165
Roads in Mie Prefecture
Roads in Nara Prefecture
Roads in Osaka Prefecture